Edward James Delahanty (October 30, 1867 – July 2, 1903), nicknamed "Big Ed", was an American professional baseball player, who spent his Major League Baseball (MLB) playing career with the Philadelphia Quakers, Cleveland Infants, Philadelphia Phillies, and Washington Senators. He was renowned as one of the game's early power hitters, and while primarily a left fielder, also spent time as an infielder. Delahanty won a batting title, batted over .400 three times, and has the fifth-highest career batting average in MLB history. He was elected to the Baseball Hall of Fame, in 1945. Delahanty died falling into the Niagara River or being swept over Niagara Falls (undetermined), after being removed from a train while intoxicated.

Delahanty's biographer argues that:
Baseball for Irish kids was a shortcut to the American dream and to self-indulgent glory and fortune. By the mid-1880s these young Irish men dominated the sport and popularized a style of play that was termed heady, daring, and spontaneous.... [Delahanty] personified the flamboyant, exciting spectator-favorite, the Casey-at-the-bat, Irish slugger. The handsome masculine athlete who is expected to live as large as he played.

Delahanty's younger brothers, Frank, Jim, Joe, and Tom, also played in the big leagues.

Early life
A Cleveland, Ohio native, Delahanty was an outfielder and powerful right-handed batter in the 1890s. Crazy Schmit, who pitched for the Giants and Orioles, said of him, "When you pitch to [Ed] Delahanty, you just want to shut your eyes, say a prayer and chuck the ball. The Lord only knows what'll happen after that." (quoted in Autumn Glory by Louis P. Masur)

Delahanty attended Cleveland's Central High School and went on to college at St. Joseph's. His baseball career started with the semipro Cleveland Shamrocks. He then signed on to play professional baseball with Mansfield of the Ohio State League in 1887. Later in the 1887 season, Delahanty played minor league ball in Wheeling, West Virginia. Before the 1888 season, the Wheeling team sold Delahanty to the Philadelphia Phillies for $1,900. He became the most prominent member of the largest group of siblings ever to play in the major leagues: brothers Frank, Jim, Joe and Tom also spent time in the majors.

Major league career

Early career
The Phillies obtained Delahanty as a replacement for Charlie Ferguson. Ferguson was a pitcher who had converted to second base for his final season, but he died early in 1888 from typhoid fever. Delahanty was brought in to fill in for him at second base. He began his career on May 22, 1888, with the Philadelphia Phillies in the National League (NL), playing 74 games that season with a .228 average, 1 HR, and 31 RBI. The next year, in 56 games, he raised his average to .293.

In 1890, he jumped to the Players' League (PL), but returned to the Phillies the next year when that league folded. Upon rejoining the Phillies, he became the team's starting left fielder. However, his off-the-field activities and excess consumption of alcohol limited his performance. He hit .306 and tallied 6 HR and 91 RBI in 1892. During one game that season, St. Louis infielder George Pinkney charged toward home plate, expecting Delahanty to bunt; Delahanty swung and hit a ball that "appeared to have been shot from a cannon", breaking Pinkney's ankle.

That same year, Delahanty was the victim behind one of "The Most Shameful Home Runs of All Time", according to authors Bruce Nash and Allan Zullo. When Delahanty's Phillies hosted the Chicago White Stockings at Philadelphia's Huntingdon Street Grounds in July, Cap Anson hit a fly ball to center field. The ball hit a pole and landed right in the "doghouse", a little-known feature of the park that was used to store numbers for the manually run scoreboard. Delahanty tried reaching over the "doghouse" and then tried crawling down into it. He got stuck, and by the time teammate Sam Thompson had freed Delahanty from the area, Anson had crossed home plate.

Middle career
Delahanty blossomed in 1893 with a .368 average, 19 home runs, and 146 RBI. He narrowly missed the Triple Crown, as teammates Billy Hamilton and Sam Thompson led the league in batting with .380 and .370 averages respectively. While with the Phillies, Delahanty played under manager Harry Wright, the man who assembled, managed, and played center field for baseball's first fully professional team, the 1869 Cincinnati Red Stockings. Wright managed the Phillies with Delahanty for four seasons, from 1890 to 1893, with the two and their fine supporting cast leading the Phils to "first division" finishes during those years, though the team never won a pennant. Between 1894 and 1896 Delahanty compiled astonishing batting marks: .407, 4 HR, 131 RBI; .404, 11 HR, 106 RBI; .397, 13 HR, 126 RBI.

In 1894, despite his high average of .407, the batting title went to Hugh Duffy with a major league record-setting .440. The 1894 Phillies outfield had a big season, with four players averaging over .400: Delahanty (.407), Sam Thompson (.407), Billy Hamilton (.404), and spare outfielder Tuck Turner (.416). Delahanty won his first batting title in 1899 with a .410 batting average, with nine homers and 137 RBI, thus becoming the first player in major league history to hit .400 three times. Delahanty was surrounded by talent in the Philadelphia outfield. Author Bill James wrote, "Any way you cut it, the Phillies had the greatest outfield of the 19th century."

On July 13, 1896, Delahanty became the second player to hit four home runs in a game. He was the first player to do so in a losing effort. (The Phillies lost the game, 9–8.) Two of them were hit into the bleachers while the other two were inside-the-park. In 1899, Delahanty hit four doubles in the same game. He remains the only man with a four-homer game and a four-double game. The same year Delahanty collected hits in 10 consecutive at bats. He tallied six-hit games in 1890 and 1894.

Later career
After switching to the new American League (AL) in 1902, Delahanty played for the Washington Senators, hitting at a .376 mark. After the 1902 season, Delahanty commented to a reporter, "I know I am getting along in years and won't be able to last much longer in first-class baseball, therefore I am going to get all the money there is in sight... Last year I was playing with the Phillies for $3,000, this season the Washington Club gives me $4,000, and if I can get $5,000 no one can blame me for taking it."

Delahanty returned to the Senators for the 1903 season. He was hitting .333 with one home run and 21 RBI in 42 games that year until the incident at Niagara Falls.

Death
Delahanty died when he was swept over Niagara Falls in early July 1903. He was apparently kicked off a train by the train's conductor for being drunk and disorderly. The conductor said Delahanty was brandishing a straight razor and threatening passengers after he consumed five whiskies. After being kicked off the train, Delahanty started his way across the International Railway Bridge connecting Buffalo, New York with Fort Erie (near Niagara Falls) and fell or jumped off the bridge (some accounts say Delahanty was yelling about death that night).<ref>[http://www.niagarablog.com/on-this-day-in-niagara-falls-history-july-2-1903/ Niagara Blog, On this day in Niagara Falls History – July 2, 1903"]</ref> Whether Delahanty died from his plunge over the Falls or drowned on the way to the Falls is uncertain. His body was found at the bottom of Niagara Falls two weeks after his death.

A study of the incident appeared with the publication of July 2, 1903: The Mysterious Death of Big Ed Delahanty, by Mike Sowell (New York, Toronto, MacMillan Publishing Co., 1992). Sowell presents the evidence of a drunken accident, suicide, and even possibly a robbery-murder (there were reports of a mysterious man following Delahanty).

Legacy

In his 16 seasons with Philadelphia, Cleveland and Washington, Delahanty batted .346, with 101 HR and 1,464 RBIs, 522 doubles, 185 triples and 455 stolen bases. He also led the league in slugging percentage and runs batted in three times each, and batted over .400 three times (1894-1895, 1899). Rogers Hornsby is the only other three-time .400-hitter in National League history (1922, 1924–25). Delahanty's lifetime batting average of .346 ranks fifth all-time behind Ty Cobb (.366), Rogers Hornsby (.358), Joe Jackson (.356), and Lefty O'Doul (.349).

Towards the end of his life, John McGraw was asked how the players of the 1920s and 1930s compared to the players of his era. "Ed Delahanty was as great a hitter as I have ever seen," was his reply.

In 2008, he was memorialized by the band The Baseball Project on their album, Volume 1: Frozen Ropes and Dying Quails''. The song, "The Death of Big Ed Delahanty", is a driving, punk-influenced ballad.

During Delahanty's career, reporters referred to him as "Big Ed". Friends and teammates usually called him "Del". The Hamburg Marines, a German Baseball Club, named their ballpark in the Hamburg quarter Billwerder after Ed Delahanty.

See also

 List of baseball players who died during their careers
 List of Major League Baseball doubles records
 List of Major League Baseball career hits leaders
 List of Major League Baseball career doubles leaders
 List of Major League Baseball career triples leaders
 List of Major League Baseball career runs scored leaders
 List of Major League Baseball career runs batted in leaders
 List of Major League Baseball career stolen bases leaders
 List of Major League Baseball batting champions
 List of Major League Baseball annual doubles leaders
 List of Major League Baseball annual triples leaders
 List of Major League Baseball annual home run leaders
 List of Major League Baseball annual runs batted in leaders
 List of Major League Baseball annual stolen base leaders
 List of Major League Baseball single-game home run leaders
 List of Major League Baseball single-game hits leaders

References

Further reading

External links

Ed Delahanty at SABR (Baseball BioProject)
Ed Delahanty at The Deadball Era

1867 births
1903 deaths
19th-century baseball players
Major League Baseball left fielders
National Baseball Hall of Fame inductees
American League batting champions
National League batting champions
National League home run champions
National League RBI champions
National League stolen base champions
Cleveland Infants players
Philadelphia Phillies players
Philadelphia Quakers players
Washington Senators (1901–1960) players
Ohio State League players
Mansfield (minor league baseball) players
Wheeling National Citys players
Wheeling Nailers (baseball) players
Baseball players from Cleveland
Burials in Calvary Cemetery (Cleveland)
Alcohol-related deaths in Canada
Accidental deaths in Ontario
People who went over Niagara Falls
Accidental deaths from falls